This is a list of things named after Calvin Coolidge, the 30th President of the United States. President Coolidge was himself named after his father, John Calvin Coolidge Sr., and his grandfather, Calvin Galusha Coolidge. As Coolidge was a somewhat common name in the United States in the 19th century, there are many places and things named "Coolidge" in the US not named for the president; those things do not appear on this list.

Places

Historic places significant to the life of Calvin Coolidge
Coolidge Homestead, Plymouth Notch, Vermont
Calvin Coolidge House, Northampton, Massachusetts
Calvin Coolidge Presidential Library and Museum, Northampton, Massachusetts

Parks and preserves
Calvin Coolidge State Forest, Vermont
Coolidge State Park, Vermont, within the forest

Natural features
Mount Coolidge, a summit in Custer County, South Dakota

Infrastructure
Calvin Coolidge Bridge, Northampton, Massachusetts
Coolidge Dam, Arizona
Coolidge Municipal Airport, in Coolidge, Arizona
Coolidge station, a former Amtrak rail station in Coolidge, Arizona

Municipalities
Coolidge, Arizona, a town near Coolidge Dam
Coolidge, Montana, a ghost town and former mining site, active circa 1914-50

Schools and colleges
Calvin Coolidge School, a public elementary school in Binghamton, New York
Calvin Coolidge Elementary School, a public elementary school in San Gabriel, California
Calvin Coolidge Elementary School, Shrewsbury, Massachusetts
Calvin Coolidge Elementary School, Wyckoff, New Jersey
Calvin Coolidge Middle School, in Peoria, Illinois
Coolidge Unified School District, in Coolidge, Arizona
Coolidge High School, in the school district
Calvin Coolidge Senior High School, a school in Washington, D.C.
Calvin Coolidge College, a former higher education institution in Boston, Massachusetts, closed in 1969.

Buildings and rooms
Coolidge Woman's Club, a historic building in Coolidge, Arizona
Coolidge Auditorium, a room in the Thomas Jefferson Building of the US Library of Congress.
Calvin Coolidge Library at Castleton University, Vermont
Coolidge Hall, a dormitory at the University of Massachusetts Amherst

Literary works
The Man Who Knew Coolidge, a 1928 novel by Sinclair Lewis
The Autobiography of Calvin Coolidge, 1929
The Calvin Coolidge Home for Dead Comedians, a 1988 novella by Bradley Denton
Seeing Calvin Coolidge in a Dream, a 1996 novel by John Derbyshire

Other
SS President Coolidge, an ocean liner that sailed from 1931 to 1942
Coolidge effect, a sexual behavior observed in some animals, apparently named for a joke involving Calvin Coolidge

See also
Presidency of Calvin Coolidge

References

Coolidge